Morphine-3-glucuronide is a metabolite of morphine produced by UGT2B7.  It is not active as an opioid agonist, but does have some action as a convulsant, which does not appear to be mediated through opioid receptors, but rather through interaction with glycine and/or GABA receptors. As a polar compound, it has a limited ability to cross the blood–brain barrier, but kidney failure may lead to its accumulation and result in seizures. Probenecid and inhibitors of P-glycoprotein can enhance uptake of morphine-3-glucuronide and, to a lesser extent, morphine-6-glucuronide. Reported side effects related to the accumulation of this metabolite include convulsions, agitation, hallucinations, hyperalgesia, and coma.

See also
 3-Monoacetylmorphine, the inactive 3,- position blocked by esterization (and thus inactive) of a semi-synthetic prodrug to morphine marking the same activity profile as the drug of this article
 Buprenorphine-3-glucuronide
 Morphine-6-glucuronide
 Morphine-N-oxide

References

4,5-Epoxymorphinans
Glucuronide esters
Opioid metabolites
Secondary alcohols
Glycine receptor antagonists
GABAA receptor negative allosteric modulators
Convulsants
Peripherally selective drugs